Ichthyotomidae is a family of polychaetes belonging to the order Phyllodocida.

Genera:
 Ichthyonomis
 Ichthyotomus Eisig, 1906

References

Polychaetes